NAIT may refer to:

National Animal Identification and Tracing in New Zealand
National Association of Industrial Technology
North American Islamic Trust, an organization in Plainfield, Indiana in the United States
Northern Alberta Institute of Technology
Neonatal alloimmune thrombocytopenia, a platelet-related disease affecting fetuses and infants, which can be fatal.
Naim NAIT, an integrated amplifier